The 35th Golden Horse Awards (Mandarin:第35屆金馬獎) took place on December 12, 1998 at Sun Yat-sen Memorial Hall in Taipei, Taiwan.

References

35th
1998 film awards
1998 in Taiwan